Nueva Ciudad Guerrero (New Guerrero City) is a city in the Mexican state of Tamaulipas. It lies on the banks of the Rio Grande / Río Bravo, near the US–Mexico border, opposite to Falcon Heights, Texas. The Lake Falcon Dam International Crossing connects Falcon Heights with Nueva Ciudad Guerrero.

It is located in Guerrero Municipality, Tamaulipas. The city's population at the 2010 census was 4,312 inhabitants, comprising 96.3% of its municipality population of 4,477 inhabitants.

History 
Ciudad Guerrero was founded in 1750, as Villa del Señor San Ignacio de Loyola de Revilla but later was named after the second President of Mexico Vicente Guerrero. The city served for a short time as the capital of the Republic of the Rio Grande in 1840.

The city name of City of New Guerrero follows the Old Guerrero City (Antigua Guerrero) that was located on a tributary of the Rio Grande, the Rio Salado, some ten kilometers from the original banks of the Rio Grande.  Old Guerrero was flooded after the construction of Falcon Dam, and moved south to its current location on the current shoreline of Falcon Lake.   The original Church  is partially above water and may still be viewable on the Salado Arm of the lake or approached on land when the water level in the lake is low. As of 2010, the area was reported to have become dangerous to visit because of the presence of rival drug cartels.

See also
José Bernardo Gutiérrez de Lara School of Medicine

External links 
Antigua Ciudad Guerrero (Guerrero Viejo)
Guerrero Viejo: Field Guide to a City Found and Lost
Guerrero Viejo: An Architectural Legacy

Populated places in Tamaulipas
Mexico–United States border crossings
Capitals of former nations
Populated places established in 1750
1750 establishments in New Spain
Tamaulipas populated places on the Rio Grande